Marchantia is a genus of liverworts in the family Marchantiaceae and the order Marchantiales.

The thallus of Marchantia  shows differentiation into two layers: an upper photosynthetic layer with a well-defined upper epidermis with pores and a lower storage layer. The thallus features tiny cup-like structures called gemma cups, containing gemmae, small packets of tissue that are used for asexual reproduction. The combination of barrel-shaped pores and the circular shape of the gemma cups are diagnostic of the genus.

Multicellular purple colored scales with single cell thickness and unicellular rhizoids are present on the ventral surface of the thallus.

Reproduction
Marchantia can reproduce both sexually and asexually. Sexual  reproduction involves sperm from antheridia on the male plant fertilizing an ovum (egg cell) in the archegonium of a female plant. The antheridia and archegonia are borne atop special gametophore stalks called antheridiophores and archegoniophores, respectively. These are borne on separate thalli and thus the plants are dioicous.

Once fertilized, the ovum is called a zygote and develops into a small sporophyte plant, which remains attached to the larger gametophyte plant. The sporophyte produces spores which develop into free-living male and female gametophyte plants.

Asexual reproduction occurs by means of gemmae, discoid clumps of cells which are genetically identical to the parent and contained in cup-like structures on the upper surface of the plant. These are dispersed when rain splashes into the cups and develop into new plants. Asexual reproduction can also occur when older parts of the plant die and the surviving newer branches develop into separate plants.

Species

 Marchantia alpestris
 Marchantia aquatica
 Marchantia berteroana
 Marchantia carrii
 Marchantia chenopoda
 Marchantia debilis
 Marchantia domingenis
 Marchantia emarginata
 Marchantia foliacia
 Marchantia grossibarba
 Marchantia inflexa
 Marchantia linearis
 Marchantia macropora
 Marchantia novoguineensis
 Marchantia paleacea
 Marchantia palmata
 Marchantia papillata
 Marchantia pappeana
 Marchantia polymorpha (also as  M. aquatica)
 Marchantia rubribarba
 Marchantia solomonensis
 Marchantia streimannii
 Marchantia subgeminata
 Marchantia vitiensis
 Marchantia wallisii 
 Marchantia nepalensis

References

External links
 
 

Marchantiales
Marchantiales genera